Obereoides joergenseni is a species of beetle in the family Cerambycidae. It was described by Bruch in 1911. It is known from Brazil and Paraguay.

References

Further reading
 

Forsteriini
Beetles described in 1911